Banksia shuttleworthiana, commonly known as bearded dryandra, is a species of low, spreading shrub that is endemic to Western Australia. It has thin, woolly-hairy stems, linear pinnatisect leaves, creamy brown to purplish flowers in heads of about forty and later, only a few egg-shaped follicles in each head.

Description
It has thin, woolly-hairy stems with undeveloped flower heads. There are between fifteen and fifty triangular, pointed lobes on each side of the leaves. Only a few follicles form in each head.

Taxonomy
This species was first formally described in 1855 by Carl Meissner who gave it the name Dryandra shuttleworthiana and published the description in Hooker's Journal of Botany and Kew Garden Miscellany from specimens collected by James Drummond.
In 2007 Austin Mast and Kevin Thiele transferred all dryandras to the genus Banksia and renamed this species Banksia shuttleworthiana.

Distribution and habitat
Banksia shuttleworthiana grows in kwongan between Geraldton and Gingin in the Avon Wheatbelt, Geraldton Sandplains, Jarrah Forest and Swan Coastal Plain biogeographic regions.

Conservation status
This banksia is classified as "not threatened" by the Western Australian Government Department of Parks and Wildlife.

References

 

shuttleworthiana
Plants described in 1855
Taxa named by Carl Meissner